Weymouth Fore River is a small bay or estuary in eastern Massachusetts and is part of the Massachusetts Bay watershed.

The headwater of Weymouth Fore River is formed by the confluence of the Monatiquot River and Smelt Brook in the Weymouth Landing area of Braintree. At this point the river's western shore is now in Quincy at the south end of the former Fore River Shipyard.

Recreation along Weymouth Fore River includes Smith Beach/Watson Park in East Braintree along the northwest shore near Weymouth Landing at the river's south end and Wessagussett Beach on the southeast shore in North Weymouth before the river enters Hingham Bay. The United States Naval Shipbuilding Museum located in Quincy Point at the west end of the Fore River Bridge features , a preserved heavy cruiser which is open to the public.

The major commercial enterprises located in the heavily industrialized area around the former shipyard include:

Braintree
 Citgo Petroleum Corporation, major oil and gasoline distribution terminal
 Quincy
 Daniel J. Quirk, Inc., motor vehicle storage and distribution facility
 Jay Cashman, Inc., heavy construction and marine equipment services
 Massachusetts Water Resources Authority, sewage sludge heat-drying and pelletizing facility
 Quincy Bay Terminal Company, short line freight rail service to CSXT South Braintree
 Twin Rivers Technologies LP, oleochemical and biofuel production
 Weymouth
 Calpine Fore River Generating Station, natural gas and oil electricity generation

References

Bodies of water of Norfolk County, Massachusetts
Geography of Braintree, Massachusetts
Quincy, Massachusetts
Weymouth, Massachusetts
Estuaries of Massachusetts
Watersheds of Boston Harbor